Arnold Allen Davis (born September 25, 1938) is a former American football linebacker in the National Football League (NFL) for the Dallas Cowboys. He played college football at Baylor University.

Early years
Davis attended W. B. Ray High School before moving on to Baylor University, where he was a two-way player as an offensive and defensive end.

Professional career
Davis was selected by the Dallas Cowboys in the fourth round (44th overall) of the 1961 NFL Draft and by the Denver Broncos in the fourth round (29th overall) of the 1961 AFL Draft.

On January 8, 1961, he signed with the Cowboys. He was converted from an offensive end into a linebacker during training camp. On September 26, he was placed on the injured reserve list after suffering a knee injury in the second game against the Minnesota Vikings. He was waived before the start of the season in 1962.

References

1938 births
Living people
Sportspeople from Corpus Christi, Texas
Players of American football from Texas
American football linebackers
Baylor Bears football players
Dallas Cowboys players